Bérangère Vattier was a French comedian. She was born on 13 July 1941 in the 15th arrondissement of Paris and died of cancer on 10 October 2001 in the 12th arrondissement of Paris.

She was the daughter of comedian Robert Vattier, and was married to the actor Robert Etcheverry from 1963 to 1983.

Filmography

Films
 1959: Faibles femmes, film by Michel Boisrond
 1961: Par-dessus le mur, film by Jean-Paul Le Chanois
 1972: L'Œuf by Félicien Marceau, film by Jean Vautrin : Justine Magis

Television
 1961: Lady Windermere's Fan (L'Eventail de Lady Windermere), TV film by François Gir : Agatha
 1961: Le Temps des copains, TV series by Robert Guez : Microbe
 1962: Les Trois Chapeaux claques, TV film by Jean-Pierre Marchand : Sagra
 1969: Agence Intérim (episode "Chaperon"), TV series by Marcel Moussy and Pierre Neurrisse : Patricia
 1973: La Feuille de Bétel (based on the novel by Jeanne Cressanges), a téléroman by Odette Collet : Ti Bâ
 1973: Le Renard et Les Grenouilles, a téléroman by Jean Vernier : Agnès Ferval
 1973: Les Écrivains (based on the novel by Michel de Saint-Pierre), TV film by Robert Guez : Odette Merlot

Theater
 1958: Gonzalo sent la violette by Robert Vattier and Albert Rieux, directed by Maurice Teynac, Théâtre Saint-Georges
 1958: L'Année du bac by José-André Lacour, directed by Yves Robert, Théâtre Édouard VII
 1965: Liolà by Luigi Pirandello, directed by Bernard Jenny, Théâtre du Vieux-Colombier

External links
 
 Bérangère Etcheverry at the Internet Movie Database
  Les Archives du Spectacle

French film actresses
1941 births
2001 deaths
Actresses from Paris
Deaths from cancer in France
French television actresses
20th-century French women